Tatum Independent School District is a public school district based in Tatum, Texas (USA).

In addition to Tatum, the district serves rural areas in northeastern Rusk and northwestern Panola counties.

In 2009, the school district was rated "recognized" by the Texas Education Agency.

History

Mike Moses served as superintendent until circa 1985. In a period on or after 1985, Robert Barrett became superintendent of the district. On July 31, 1988, Barrett was scheduled to resign from his position.

In 2017 J.P. Richardson became the sole person considered for the superintendent position at Tatum ISD. He was previously the superintendent of the Gladewater Independent School District. Tatum expressed satisfaction in taking the Tatum job.

Schools
Tatum High (Grades 9-12)
Tatum Middle (Grades 6-8)
Tatum Elementary (Grades 3-5)
Tatum Primary (Grades PK-2)

Tatum ISD is TEA Academically Recognized District for the fourth year in row and has two Exemplary rated campuses and two Recognized rated campuses. Tatum Primary is Exemplary for the fifth straight year, Tatum Elementary has earned a fifth consecutive Recognized rating, Tatum Middle is Recognized for the third consecutive year and Tatum High is Exemplary.

References

External links
 

School districts in Rusk County, Texas
School districts in Panola County, Texas